is a Japanese tokusatsu drama. It is the 31st entry in the Kamen Rider series and the second series of the Reiwa period.

Main characters

Touma Kamiyama
 is a novelist who becomes the new  after receiving a red Wonder Ride Book from Daichi Kamijo. When he was nine, Touma befriended Luna and Kento. When Kento's father, Hayato, defected to the Megids and kidnapped Luna, she and Touma tried to escape. While he was unable to save her, he was apparently saved by Daichi, who told Touma he can decide stories' endings before giving the boy his Brave Dragon Wonder Ride Book. In the aftermath, Touma lost much of his childhood memories, but suffered recurring nightmares about Luna.

In the present, as his home city is attacked by a monster from Wonder World, Touma activates the Wonder Ride Book in his possession and transforms into the new Kamen Rider Saber. Amidst his battles against the Megids, Touma discovers a strange connection to the mysterious Kamen Rider Calibur before discovering Daichi had become Calibur and betrayed the Sword of Logos. After Kento's apparent death and defeating Calibur, Touma eventually recovers his lost memories. While investigating conspiracies within the Sword of Logos, Touma is falsely branded a traitor by members of the organization's Southern Base and forced to go AWOL with Mei and Yuri. As his allies learn the truth however, Touma slowly reconciles his friendships with them. After rescuing Luna from the world of Void, she chooses Touma to wield Wonder World's power and become its guardian, which he accepts despite the risk of fading from existence. While fighting Storious, Touma acquires the Wonder Almighty Wonder Ride Book, which allows him to defeat the Megid, undo Storious' damage to Wonder World and Earth, revive himself, and freely visit his friends on Earth without vanishing. Touma later semi-retires from being Saber so he can resume his work as a novelist.

During the events of the film Kamen Rider: Beyond Generations, Touma comes out of retirement at Rintaro and Sophia's behest, reunites with their fellow comrades of the new Sword of Logos, and joins forces with the Igarashi siblings and Fenix commander, Hiromi Kadota, to combat Diablo and the Crispers.

Touma uses the  Wonder Ride Book in conjunction with the sheath-like  belt and the  knightly sword, which grants pyrokinesis, to transform into Kamen Rider Saber. While transformed, he gains the use of the  familiar for combat assistance. He later obtains the  motorcycle, created from the Wonder Ride Book of the same name. He can also combine Brave Dragon with other Wonder Ride Books and access the following forms:
: A form accessed from the Brave Dragon and  Wonder Ride Books.
: A form accessed from the Brave Dragon and  Wonder Ride Books. Using the latter book on its own grants Saber the ability to conjure a cloud for him to ride on.
: A Wonder Combo accessed from the Brave Dragon, Storm Eagle, and Saiyuu Journey Wonder Ride Books. Using Saiyuu Journey on its own in this form also grants Saber the ability to conjure Sun Wukong's Ruyi Jingu Bang.
: A form accessed from the sentient self-titled Wonder Ride Book and Brave Dragon that grants Saber the use of the  familiar for combat assistance. In this form, he utilizes a reverse grip-based fighting style with the Kaenken Rekka. Due to its traumatic past, Primitive Dragon initially possesses Touma and fights in a feral manner. After Touma befriends it, the Wonder Ride Book allows him to use its powers freely. This form can also be used with other Wonder Ride Books, such as Lion Senki.

If necessary, Touma can also use his allies' Wonder Ride Books to either assume different  forms or augment his attacks:
: A form accessed from the Brave Dragon and Jackun-to-Domamenoki Wonder Ride Books. Using the latter book on its own equips Saber with the Entangle Gaunt.
: A form accessed from the Brave Dragon and Peter Fantasista Wonder Ride Books. Using the latter book on its own equips Saber with the Capture Hook and grants him the use of the Fighting Fairy for combat assistance.
: A form accessed from the Brave Dragon and Needle Hedgehog Wonder Ride Books. Using the latter book on its own grants Saber the ability to generate quills, while scanning Needle Hedgehog in the Kaenken Rekka allows him to cover his sword with energy spikes.
: A form accessed from the Brave Dragon, Needle Hedgehog, and Peter Fantasista Wonder Ride Books.
: A form accessed from the Brave Dragon, Storm Eagle, and Kobuta 3 Kyoudai Wonder Ride Books. Using Kobuta 3 Kyoudai on its own equips Saber with the Steppig Wise and grants him the use of the 3 Little Pig Brothers for combat assistance.
: A form accessed from the Brave Dragon and  Wonder Ride Books. Using the latter book on its own arms Saber with the  sword, which is capable of summoning a giant version of itself, while scanning King of Arthur in the original King Excalibur allows him to transform the giant version into a robot form called King of Arthur, which can in turn transform Saber into the  flaming sword to dual wield alongside its  sword.
: A form accessed from the Brave Dragon and Bremen no Rock Band Wonder Ride Books. Using the latter book on its own equips Saber with the Gig Arm.
: A form accessed from the Brave Dragon and Lamp Do Alangina Wonder Ride Books. Using the latter book on its own arms Saber with the Raimeiken Ikazuchi.
: A form accessed from the Brave Dragon, Storm Eagle, and King of Arthur Wonder Ride Books.
: A form accessed from the Brave Dragon and  Wonder Ride Books. This form appears exclusively in the Hyper Battle DVD Gather! Hero!! The Explosive Birth of Dragon Televi-Kun.

Additionally, Touma can achieve the following forms by using unique Wonder Ride Books in place of Brave Dragon:
: A form accessed from the self-titled Wonder Ride Book that equips Saber with the left arm-mounted  and grants him the use of the God Beast Brave Dragon, and  familiars for combat assistance. This form first appears in the film Kamen Rider Saber Theatrical Short Story: The Phoenix Swordsman and the Book of Ruin.
: A form accessed from the self-titled Wonder Ride Book that equips Saber with the  gauntlet, which allows him to use up to three Wonder Ride Books at once to augment his attacks, and grants him the ability to summon the God Beast Brave Dragon to ride into battle.
: A form accessed from the Primitive Dragon and  Wonder Ride Books that grants Saber control over the former, use of the  familiar for combat assistance, and control over fire, water, lightning, Earth, and wind. Touma can also lend Elemental Dragon to any of his allies with a corresponding element to enhance their own powers.
: A Kamen Rider Ghost-themed form accessed from the self-titled Wonder Ride Book that grants Saber the use of the 15 heroic Eyecons' Hoodie Ghosts for combat assistance. This form appears exclusively in the web-exclusive series Kamen Rider Saber × Ghost.
: A novelization/Zenkaizer-themed fusion form accessed from the self-titled Wonder Ride Book, which contains the power of all the main heroes of both the Kamen Rider and Super Sentai franchises. This form appears exclusively in the crossover film Saber + Zenkaiger: Super Hero Senki.
: An enhanced version of Saber's Brave Dragon form accessed from the  Wonder Ride Book that grants all the Wonder Ride Books' powers.
: A form accessed from the self-titled Wonder Ride Book. This form appears exclusively in the stage show Kamen Rider Saber: Final Stage.

While transformed, he gains control over all of the Seiken and their elemental powers. Similar to his previous forms, he can also combine Brave Dragon with other Wonder Ride Books to access the following forms:
: An enhanced version of Saber's Crimson Dragon form.
: A form accessed from the Brave Dragon, Lion Senki, and Lamp Do Alangina Wonder Ride Books that grants Touma the Kaenken Rekka, Suiseiken Nagare, and Raimeiken Ikazuchi's powers. Additionally, Rintaro and Kento can share this form's power through their respective personal Wonder Ride Books.
: An enhanced version of Saber's Dragon Arthur form. This form appears exclusively in the toyline.

Mei Sudo
 is a new editor of  who is in charge of publishing Touma's work. After Touma joins the Sword of Logos, Mei decides to help his ally Rintaro adjust to modern life and receives a special white book she can use to alert Touma and his allies to Megid attacks. Eventually, Mei begins a relationship with Rintaro and goes on to become a successful editor.

Rintaro Shindo
 is the current  and student of Kenshin Nagamine before the latter was killed by Zooous, whom Rintaro developed a vendetta against. After meeting Touma, he senses the novelist's ability and asks him to join the Sword of Logos. When Touma becomes the new Kamen Rider Saber, Rintaro decides to stay in and work at the former's bookstore, developing a relationship with Mei along the way. Following the Sword of Logos' final battle with the Megid Storious, Rintaro is elected to become part of the organization's new ruling council.

Rintaro uses the  Wonder Ride Book in conjunction with the SworDriver and the  knightly sword, which grants hydrokinesis, to transform into . While transformed, he gains the use of the  familiar for combat assistance. He can also combine Lion Senki with other Wonder Ride Books and access the following forms:
: A form accessed from the Lion Senki and  Wonder Ride Books. Using the latter book on its own equips Blades with the extendable  claw and grants him the use of the  familiar for combat assistance.
: A form accessed from the Lion Senki and  Wonder Ride Books. This form appears exclusively in the toyline.
: A Wonder Combo accessed from the Lion Senki, Peter Fantasista, and Tenkuu no Pegasus Wonder Ride Books. Using Tenkuu no Pegasus on its own grants Blades increased agility and flight capabilities.

Additionally, Rintaro can achieve the following forms by using unique Wonder Ride Books in place of Lion Senki:
: A form accessed from the self-titled Wonder Ride Book that equips Blades with the  gauntlet, which allows him to use up to three Wonder Ride Books at once to augment his attacks, and the twin shoulder-mounted , which allow him to fire streams of pressurized water, and grants him the  ability where he transforms into an evolved version of the Animal Lion Senki.
: A form accessed from the self-titled Wonder Ride Book that grants Blades cryokinesis and the ability to summon the souls of deceased swordsmen, such as his teacher, to aid him in battle.
: A Kamen Rider Specter-themed form accessed from the self-titled Wonder Ride Book that arms Blades with the former's Deep Slasher. This form appears exclusively in the web-exclusive series Kamen Rider Specter × Blades.

Kento Fukamiya
 is Touma and Luna's childhood friend, son of Hayato, and a sage-class samurai and the  who was initially a member of the Sword of Logos before he became the third Dark Swordsman. Behind his cheerful demeanor, Kento hides regrets for Luna's disappearance and his father's betrayal 15 years prior to the series, though he later discovers Hayato was seemingly killed by and lost his Rider powers to Daichi. After helping Touma recover his lost memories, Kento challenges Daichi to a duel to avenge his father, only to be defeated by him and consumed by the latter's sword. Following this, Kento's Rider equipment falls into Touma's care.

Trapped in the Ankokuken Kurayami, Kento discovers Isaac's conspiracy and witnesses visions of various futures wherein the world is either destroyed due to the Almighty Book or saved by Touma following his death. Traumatized, Kento frees himself under mysterious means, steals the Calibur equipment from Reika, becomes the third Calibur, and goes rogue to avert the visions' events by sealing all of the Seiken. While Touma and Yuri eventually save Kento from himself and convince him to help them stop Isaac, Kento remains resolute in his goal to save Touma and the world, temporarily continuing to use the Calibur title to honor his father's legacy. However, Kento learns Hayato survived and has a heart-to-heart with him, after which the former regains confidence in himself, reassumes his original Rider powers, and returns the Ankokuken Kurayami to Yuri. After saving Earth and Wonder World from Storious, Kento temporarily takes over Touma's bookstore until the latter returns one year later.

Eight years later, Kento takes a job as a translator and is engaged to be married to Yuina Tachibana.

As the Thunder Swordsman, Kento uses the  Wonder Ride Book in conjunction with the SworDriver and the  knightly sword, which grants electrokinesis, to transform into . While transformed, he gains the use of the  familiar for combat assistance. Like Rintaro, he also owns a Gatrikephone. Kento can also combine Lamp Do Alangina with other Wonder Ride Books and access the following forms:
: A form accessed from the Lamp Do Alangina and  Wonder Ride Books. Using the latter book on its own grants Espada the ability to generate energy quills.
: A form accessed from the Lamp do Alangina and  Wonder Ride Books. This form appears exclusively in the video game Kamen Rider Battle: Ganbarizing.
: A Wonder Combo accessed from the Lamp Do Alangina, Needle Hedgehog, and Tri Cerberus Wonder Ride Books. Using Tri Cerberus on its own grants Espada increased durability, while scanning the aforementioned book in the Raimeiken Ikazuchi grants him the use of the  familiar for combat assistance.

During the events of the V-Cinema Kamen Rider Saber: Trio of Deep Sin, Kento acquires the  Wonder Ride Book and the  knightly sword.

Recurring characters

Kamen Rider Calibur
It was originally associated with the Sword of Logos until the original bearer of the name was manipulated by Isaac into siding with the Megids, at which point "Calibur" became synonymous with "renegade" until the third and fourth bearer fights alongside the Sword of Logos.

Anyone who becomes Calibur uses the  Wonder Ride Book in conjunction with the  belt and the  broadsword, which grants umbrakinesis, to transform. While transformed, they gain the use of the  familiar for combat assistance.

After Daichi's identity as the second Calibur is exposed, he obtains the  Wonder Ride Book, which allows him to transform into a stronger version of Calibur that grants him the use of the  familiar for combat assistance. After Kento becomes Calibur, Jaou Dragon gains the ability to seal the Seiken, which can only be undone if the owner is either fatally wounded or defeated.

Hayato Fukamiya
 is the father of Kento and the first Dark Swordsman who left the Sword of Logos 15 years prior to the series and allied himself with the Megids after the Ankokuken Kurayami subjected him to nightmares depicting his leader Isaac ending the world and ordering him to sacrifice Luna. This spurred Hayato to steal numerous Wonder Ride books and release the Megids on Earth as a cover to abduct Luna and uncover the truth of his visions, only to be mortally wounded by Daichi.

In the tie-in prequel manga, Supplementary Volume Kamen Rider Saber: Kamen Rider Buster the Comic, which takes place 20 years prior to the series, Hayato aided his master, Toshikazu Kamikawa, in hastening his friendly rival, Ryo's, awakening as the new Earth Swordsman.

Daichi Kamijo
 is the previous Flame Swordsman and the second Dark Swordsman. 15 years prior to the series, he is forced to fight Hayato to protect Touma and Luna from him. Failing to save her, Daichi left his Brave Dragon Wonder Ride Book with Touma before seemingly sacrificing himself in his pursuit of Hayato. Upon defeating Hayato and taking the Ankokuken Kurayami however, Daichi saw visions of the world's destruction. Discarding the Kaenken Rekka and faking his death, he aligned himself with the Megids as the new Calibur to "learn the truth of the world" and continue his fallen comrade's mission to expose Isaac.

After he resurfaces in the present and several battles with his successor, Daichi reveals his secrets to Touma and almost entrusts his Rider equipment to him before Desast mortally wounds the former while Reika steals his equipment before they eventually come into Kento's possession.

Sophia
 is a simulacrum based on a priestess who connected Wonder World and Earth two millennia prior, the protector of books for the Sword of Logos' Northern Base and the creator of the Wonder Ride Books who watches over Touma Kamiyama and the base's other swordsmen. After confronting her former apprentice, Daichi Kamijo, Sophia is kidnapped and imprisoned by Reika Shindai under the orders of her leader, Isaac, who created her as a possible replacement in the Greater Books recreation ritual in the event that Luna could not be recovered. Despite this, Yuri and Touma are able to reassemble their fellow swordsmen before Kento Fukamiya rescues Sophia. As the Megid Storious enacts his plan to destroy Wonder World and Earth and due to her connection to the former, Yuri gives Sophia the Ankokuken Kurayami to protect her from fading from existence. She later uses the sword to become the fourth and final Calibur, aka the Dark Swordswoman, to aid the swordsmen in stopping Storious. Following the battle, Sophia is elected to become part of the Sword of Logos' new ruling council.

Tassel
 is the guardian of Wonder World and the series narrator who gradually makes his presence known to Touma and the others, though he is unable to directly intervene in human world affairs. He was originally a human named , who came to Wonder World in the past alongside the first Master Logos, Storious, Legeiel, and Zooous, where they met a priestess who connected their worlds and chose Victor to defend Wonder World. When Storious deceived Legeiel and Zooous into becoming Megids and betrayed their friends, Victor created the Ankokuken Kurayami and Kougouken Saikou and helped Logos divide the Tome of Omniscience, keeping half with him in Wonder World while Logos returned to their world with the other half to ensure stability between the worlds. As part of his plans to destroy the world in the present, Logos' descendant Isaac banishes Tassel, but the latter's consciousness ends up in that of Touma and Primitive Dragons until the novelist tames the Wonder Ride Book, freeing Tassel in the process. After taking time to regenerate, Tassel entrusts Touma and his allies with protecting Earth and Wonder World before he leaves to protect Luna, only to be killed by Storious, who steals his half of the Tome of Omniscience. Following this, his soul continues to reside in Wonder World along with those of Luna and the Megids.

Tassel is portrayed by Tobi from Les Romanesques.

Luna
 is Touma and Kento's childhood friend who, like the former, hails from Wonder World and serves as a link between it and Earth. After Isaac manipulated Hayato into targeting her, she attempted to run away with Touma, only to be pulled into and trapped in the world of Void. In the present, Touma eventually makes contact with her through their childhood book, Wonder Story, and brings her to the human world. She returns to Wonder World to stay with Tassel until Storious kills him, leading to Luna seeking refuge with the Sword of Logos. When Storious attempts to destroy Wonder World and Earth, Luna sacrifices herself to give Touma the Wonder Almighty Wonder Ride Book so he, Rintaro, and Kento can defeat Storious. Following this, her soul resides in Wonder World along with that of Tassel's.

Sword of Logos
The  is a mysterious organization formed by a secret sect of swordsmen sworn to protect the ancient  and keep peace in the world. The highest authority who approve the organization's policies are the  Following their final battle with Storious, the Sword of Logos chose to abolish the Master Logos and Sage positions in favor of a council of four.

Those who use the SworDrivers can use up to three books while those who only use a Seiken or separate driver are limited to one at a time. While all of the Riders are able to assume different forms based on the Wonder Ride Books in their possession, books with the same elemental affinity as their sword grant more power compared to those that do not, with the SworDriver users able to achieve  forms.

Northern Base
The  is a branch of the Sword of Logos based in the North Pole and serves as most of the swordsmen's base of operations. Following Touma becoming Kamen Rider Saber, some of the organization's members choose to use his bookstore as a passageway from the Northern Base and back.

Ryo Ogami
He investigates Hayato's betrayal and defection from the Sword of Logos while caring for his son, until he discovers Hayato was seemingly killed by Daichi and both were manipulated by Isaac. After saving both Wonder World and Earth, Ryo plans to retire from the Sword of Logos so he can pursue a teaching career and raise and teach new generations of swordsmen.

In the tie-in prequel manga, Supplementary Volume Kamen Rider Saber: Kamen Rider Buster the Comic, Ryo met and befriended Haruka Kiritani during their childhood and attended  together, where the former became a teenage delinquent for three years. 20 years prior to the series, after Ryo found the Genbu Shinwa Wonder Ride Book, he and Haruka were attacked by Shimii and rescued by their Japanese classics teacher, Toshikazu Kamikawa, who chose Ryo to become his apprentice and eventually succeed him as the second Earth Swordsman. Ryo agreed to become the strongest swordsman and protect Haruka's smile. Sometime after Ryo surpassed Kamikawa, he married Haruka, who gave birth to Sora six years after Hayato's betrayal.

Ryo uses the  Wonder Ride Book in conjunction with the  Zweihänder, which grants geokinesis, to transform into . While transformed, he gains superhuman strength. He can also combine Genbu Shinwa with other Wonder Ride Books and access the following forms:
: A form accessed from the Genbu Shinwa and  Wonder Ride Books. Using the latter book on its own equips Buster with the vine-like , which is capable of firing  projectiles that can conjure a massive beanstalk.

If necessary, Ryo can also use his allies' Wonder Ride Books to assume different forms:
: A form accessed from the Genbu Shinwa and Bremen no Rock Band Wonder Ride Books. Using the latter book on its own equips Buster with the Gig Arm.

Ren Akamichi
He was a member of Sword of Logos' Northern Base who admired Kento and developed a rivalry with Touma. Despite his skill as a swordsman, Ren's irresponsibility and tendency for trouble-making often gets the better of him. After his faith in the idea of true strength and Kento are shattered, Ren leaves the organization to find himself, fighting his former allies and traveling with the rogue Megid Desast. While helping the Sword of Logos stop Isaac, later Storious, Ren eventually takes Touma's words of what true strength is to heart and defeats Desast in battle, keeping the Megid's Alter Ride Book and Mumeiken Kyomu to aid in his fight until the book disappears. After saving both Wonder World and Earth from Storious, Ren continues his journey across the Earth, while keeping in touch with his allies.

Ren uses the  Wonder Ride Book in conjunction with the  ninjatō, which can be reconfigured into either a pair of swords or a shuriken as well as grant aerokinesis, to transform into . While transformed, he gains superhuman speed. He can also combine Sarutobi Ninjaden with other Wonder Ride Books and access the following forms:
: A form accessed from the Sarutobi Ninjaden and  Wonder Ride Books. Using the latter book on its own equips Kenzan with the left arm-mounted  shield, which is capable of enlarging itself to the size of a house, and grants him the use of the  familiar for combat assistance, while scanning Kobuta 3 Kyoudai in the Fuusouken Hayate allows him to either conjure walls or divide into three duplicates of himself.

If necessary, Ren can also use his allies' Wonder Ride Books to assume different forms:
: A form accessed from the Sarutobi Ninjaden and Jackun-to-Domamenoki Wonder Ride Books. Using the latter book on its own equips Kenzan with the Entangle Gaunt.

Tetsuo Daishinji
 is the blunt yet bashful blacksmith for the Sword of Logos' Northern Base known as the  who maintains the Seiken and Wonder Ride Books and has an enhanced sense of hearing. He later builds a friendship with Touma. After saving Wonder World and Earth, Daishinji returns to his blacksmith duties full-time.

Tetsuo uses the  Wonder Ride Book in conjunction with the  pistol sword, which grants sonokinesis, to transform into . He can also combine Hanselnuts to Gretel with other Wonder Ride Books and access the following forms:
: A form accessed from the Hanselnuts to Gretel and  Wonder Ride Books. Using the latter book on its own equips Slash with the  gauntlet, which is capable of playing rock music that increases his fighting spirit, while scanning Bremen no Rock Band in the Onjuuken Suzune allows him to generate musical notes for healing capabilities. In this form, Tetsuo displays an energetic and cheerful attitude that contrasts with his usually timid behavior.

If necessary, Tetsuo can also use his allies' Wonder Ride Books to assume different forms:
: A form accessed from the Hanselnuts to Gretel and Kobuta 3 Kyoudai Wonder Ride Books. Using the latter book on its own equips Slash with the Steppig Wise and grants him the use of the 3 Little Pig Brothers for combat assistance.

Southern Base
The  is the main branch of the Sword of Logos.

Isaac
 is the nihilistic and psychopathic leader of the Sword of Logos and the last known bearer of the Master Logos title who seeks to claim the Almighty Book for himself and reshape the world in his twisted image, an act which the organization considers forbidden. He originally hailed from a clan consisting of the original Master Logos' descendants who had their lives extended and youth maintained across multiple generations to protect humanity and the Book of Ancients alongside Tassel since time immemorial. However, Isaac slowly grew disillusioned towards humanity and angry at his predecessors for not using the Greater Books power. With help from the Megid, Storious, they manipulate their respective factions from the shadows to further their plans until the former eventually makes himself and his true intentions known by setting out to claim his swordsmen's Seiken to perform a ritual that will grant him god-like power. In spite of the Northern Base swordsmen interrupting the ritual, Isaac succeeds in manifesting his ancestor's half of the Tome of Omniscience as the  Wonder Ride Book as he discards his title as Master Logos and declares war on humanity. While seeking to refine his power further, Isaac battles the swordsmen and the Shindais several times until Touma acquires the Haouken Xross Saber and overpowers him. Afterwards, Storious betrays and kills Isaac to steal the latter's Rider powers for his own plans. 

Additionally, Isaac can use Omni Force in conjunction with the  belt to transform into . During combat, he is capable of summoning multiple giant Caladbolgs that can transform into the  mechas as reinforcements. He later acquires the ability to telepathically manipulate the Seiken and control their users like puppets, barring the Haouken Xross Saber and Touma.

Reika Shindai
She arrives at the Northern Base to observe Touma's increasing power as Saber and ask him to join the Southern Base. After he refuses however, Reika secretly kidnaps Sophia and frames the novelist for it, temporarily turning the Northern Base's swordsmen against him. As the swordsmen slowly realize the truth, Reika receives new orders from her leader, Isaac, to steal their Rider equipment and eliminate them. However, Reika's loyalty to him begins to waver when she learns her superior has been secretly conspiring with the Megids. Upon learning of Isaac's true plans, she and Ryoga aid the Northern Base in stopping him, and later Storious. Initially cold and methodical, she slowly warms up to the other swordsmen over the course of the series, but sometimes gets overzealous when anyone gets close to her brother.

Reika uses the  Wonder Ride Book in conjunction with the  rapier, which grants typhokinesis, to transform into . While transformed, she gains the use of insect-based abilities and constructs.

Ryoga Shindai
As the right hand of whoever holds the "Master Logos" title, the stoic and prideful Ryoga initially serves the current holder, Isaac, despite seeing him as unworthy of the title. Upon discovering his superior had been planning to bring chaos to the world behind his and Reika's backs, the disillusioned Shindais aid the Northern Base in stopping him. Following the Sword of Logos' final battle with the Megid Storious, Ryoga is elected to become part of the organization's new ruling council.

Ryoga uses the  Wonder Ride Book in conjunction with the  sword, which can be reconfigured into a trident as well as grant chronokinesis, to transform into . While transformed, he gains the ability to teleport via his chronokinetic powers.

Megids
The  are monsters who tried to steal the Almighty Book two millennia ago before they were thwarted and renew their efforts in the present day.

The three commander Megids were originally the first humans to visit Wonder World millennia prior and friends of Tassel, the original Master Logos, and a priestess who connected Wonder World to Earth before they betrayed their friends and assumed their monstrous forms after stealing fragments of the Tome of Omniscience. Upon their deaths, their human souls are released, purified, and return to Wonder World to reunite with Tassel, grateful to Touma for saving them.

Storious
 is a dark and reserved Megid who controls the genre of stories and values knowledge above all else. 2,000 years prior, he was originally a poet who found enjoyment in creating new stories. While accompanying the original Master Logos and Victor to find the Almighty Book for humanity's benefit however, Storious fell into despair after the Tome of Omniscience revealed every work he had and would make in his lifetime. Believing humanity is incapable of creating original thoughts and embracing the idea that all things are at their most beautiful when they are ending, he manipulates Legeiel and Zooous into becoming monsters alongside him and help him steal pages from the Almighty Book so he can end all existence. Retaining his original personality following his transformation, Storious spends the next two millennia manipulating his comrades and Isaac into facilitating his goal. After claiming his fallen Megid pawns' Alter Ride Books for the Tome of Omniscience fragments they contained and creating Charybdis to further his plot, Storious kills Isaac and Tassel to claim the Tome of Omniscience. He then creates Another Sophia and has Charybdis consume her, numerous humans trapped in Ride Books, the Tome of Omnisciences fragments, and himself before emerging from Charybdis, destroying the Megid in the process. Using the newly created  Wonder Ride Book, Storious attempts to destroy both Wonder World and Earth, but is defeated by Touma, Rintaro, and Kento via the power of the Wonder Almighty Wonder Ride Book. As he dies, Storious regrets his actions and rediscovers the meaning of joy.

In his Megid form, Storious has ergokinesis, teleportation capabilities, duplication capabilities, eye-based lightning blasts, can siphon energy, and seal the SworDrivers, and wields the two-pronged  longsword. After gaining the Grimoire Wonder Ride Book, Storious gains necromancy, which he uses to revive the Four Sages as his undead minions, the Lords of Wise. He can also use Grimoire in conjunction with the Dooms Driver Buckle to become .

Legeiel
 is a calm, manipulative Megid who controls the genre of mythical creatures and was originally a humble and friendly individual. Unlike his peers, he does not want to be actively involved, only lending his help when necessary. However, his pride often gets the better of him, especially when things do not go his way. After being defeated by Saber with the Primitive Dragon Wonder Ride Book, a frustrated and desperate Legeiel enhances his personal Alter Ride Book to evolve into  and seek revenge despite the fatal side effects of his transformation. However, Touma as Saber Elemental Primitive Dragon destroys Legeiel in an act of mercy.

In battle, Legeiel has enhanced jumping capabilities, various elemental powers, the ability to reflect attacks, and wields the  double-edged sword. As Legeiel Forbidden, he can combine his elemental powers and produce explosions.

Zooous
 is a cruel, hot-headed Megid who controls the genre of animals and was originally a calm and cheerful individual. In spite of his brutish personality, he prefers to fight worthy opponents, sparing those he considers weak or unmotivated to provoke and humiliate them into becoming stronger or more aggressive should they re-encounter each other in battle. 15 years prior, while taking part in the Megids' invasion, he murdered Sword of Logos member, Kenshin Nagamine. As a result, Zooous developed a rivalry with the swordsman's student and successor, Rintaro. After evolving into  while fighting Rintaro and Touma, the Megid faces the former while attacking the Northern Base and is destroyed by Rintaro as Blades Tategami Hyoujuu Senki.

As Zooous Predator, he has access to a feral, berserker rage.

Charybdis
Charybdis came into being when Storious combines the Gansekiou Golem, Hanzaki Sanshouou, and Mienikui Ahirunoko Alter Ride Books into Charybdis' self-titled Alter Ride Book and using competitive eater  as his host. While Charybdis is separated from Mami and destroyed by Kamen Rider Saikou, Storious transfers the Alter Ride Book to Mami's twin sister , with the reconstituted Charybdis devouring Mami to increase his power with both twins inside him. Though Kamen Riders Saber and Saikou destroy Charybdis once more after extracting the sisters, Charybdis later reconstitutes without a host body and becomes Storious' enforcer.

After partially devouring Desast and the Eternal Phoenix Wonder Ride Book to evolve into , Charybdis enacts his role in Storious' plan by consuming him, Another Sophia, Legeiel and Zooous' Alter Ride Books, and numerous humans who were trapped in Ride Books before Storious destroys him from the inside out.

In battle, Charybdis wields the  hatchet and possesses his component Megids' powers, along with the added ability to consume anything and absorbing the powers of whatever he devours. As Charybdis Hercules, he gains the ability to generate seismic tremors and Desast and Falchion's powers.

Charybdis is voiced by  while Mami and Remi Imoto are portrayed by Mio and Yae respectively.

Megid Combatants
The commanders later use an ancient ability to turn humans who can see Wonder World into Megids, though if their Alter Ride Books are destroyed before the transformation becomes permanent, they will be separated from their host.

: A namesake-themed monster that Legeiel created from the  Alter Ride Book. It is destroyed by Kamen Rider Saber.
: A horde of ant-themed monsters that Storious created from the  Alter Ride Book. The queen is destroyed by Kamen Rider Blades.
: A katydid-themed monster that Storious also created from the Ari ka Kirigirisu Alter Ride Book. It is destroyed by Kamen Rider Saber. The Kirigirisu Megid is also voiced by Akinori Egoshi.
: A giant salamander-themed monster that Zooous created from the  Alter Ride Book. After evolving into its enhanced form, it is destroyed by Kamen Rider Saber.
: Four namesake-themed monsters that Zooous created from the  Alter Ride Book. The first and third Piranha Megids are destroyed by Kamen Rider Saber while the second and fourth are destroyed by Kamen Rider Espada.
: A trio of namesake/gorgon-themed monsters that Legeiel created from the  Alter Ride Book. The first Medusa Megid is destroyed by Kamen Rider Blades while the second and third are destroyed by Kamen Rider Saber.
: Six duck-themed monsters that Storious created from the  Alter Ride Book. Five of the six Ahiru Megids are destroyed by Kamen Riders Saber, Blades, Espada, and Slash. After evolving into the swan-like , the last one is destroyed by Kamen Rider Slash.
: Seven namesake-themed monsters that Legeiel created from the  Alter Ride Book. They are destroyed by Kamen Riders Saber, Blades, Buster, Kenzan, Slash, and Calibur.
It is separated from Yuki and destroyed by Kamen Riders Saber and Saikou.
It is separated from Shingo by Kamen Rider Saikou and destroyed by Kamen Rider Saber.
: A cat-themed monster that Zooous created from the  Alter Ride Book and Mei to help him torment Rintaro. It is separated from Mei by Kamen Rider Blades and destroyed by him and Kamen Rider Saber.

Other Megid Combatants
: A namesake-themed monster that Zooous created from the  Alter Ride Book. It is destroyed by Kamen Rider Buster. This Megid appears exclusively in the tie-in prequel manga Supplementary Volume Kamen Rider Saber: Kamen Rider Buster the Comic.
: An atypical Zenkaizer/Super Sentai-themed Megid that Asmodeus created to serve him. It is destroyed by Akaranger and Twokaizer.
: A namesake-themed Megid created from its Alter Ride Book, which allows the user to merge with the Megid, and Rui Mitarai. Rui in his Megid form is defeated by Kamen Riders Sabela and Durendal. This Megid appears exclusively in the web-exclusive special Kamen Rider Saber Spin-off: Kamen Rider Sabela & Durendal.

Kamen Rider Falchion

Anyone who becomes Falchion uses the  Wonder Ride Book in conjunction with the sheath-like  belt and the  knightly sword, which grants nihili- and pyrokinesis, to transform. While transformed, they gain the use of the  familiar for combat assistance.

During the events of the V-Cinema Kamen Rider Saber: Trio of Deep Sin, Mamiya, Yuina Tachibana, and Shinjiro Shinozaki acquire Falchion's powers and utilize the  Wonder Ride Book, which allows the user to read and alter people's pasts, in place of Eternal Phoenix to transform.

Bahato
 is the first Void Swordsman and a former ally of Yuri's from millennia prior who first appears in the film Kamen Rider Saber Theatrical Short Story: The Phoenix Swordsman and the Book of Ruin. Bahato was a Sword of Logos member until his family was slain by someone he considered a close friend before they became obsessed with power. During the events of the film, Bahato is released and attempts to reenact his plan before Touma re-seals him. Late into the series, Isaac comes into possession of the Book of Ruin and frees Bahato to aid in his plan in obtaining godhood and destroying humanity. After Touma kills Bahato, Desast takes the latter's sword while his soul returns to Wonder World, his faith in humanity restored.

Desast
 is a Fenrir/Japanese tiger beetle/"The Singing Bone"-themed rogue, hybrid Megid who Storius created on a whim with no purpose in mind, which Desast compensates by fighting ideal opponents. 15 years prior, Desast took part in the Megids' invasion and killed several of the Sword of Logos' swordsmen before he was sealed in his self-titled Alter Ride Book. In the present, Daichi releases Desast so the latter can rejoin the Megids' fight against the Sword of Logos. However, Desast chooses to act independently instead. Desast takes an interest in Ren due to their similar mindsets, accompanying the ninja after he leaves the Sword of Logos. Following Bahato's demise at Touma's hands, Desast stealthily takes the former's sword and becomes the new Falchion to battle Storious, only for Charybdis to damage his Alter Ride Book. Slowly dying as a result, he forces Ren to face him in battle and give him a honorable death.

In battle, Desast has teleportation, the ability to hide in shadows, and wields the  sword, with which he can perform the  finisher and wield as Falchion alongside the Mumeiken Kyomu.

After becoming Falchion, he also became immortal and makes use of the Eternal Phoenix Wonder Ride Book in an attempt to negate his damaged Alter Ride Book's effects, though the former contributes to the latter's damage in the process and slowly kills him.

During the events of the web-exclusive series Kamen Rider Outsiders, Desast is revived and acquires the  Wonder Ride Book, a Seiken SworDriver, and the  sword, which allow him to transform into .

Yuri
 is an ancient swordsman known as the  who once wielded the Ankokuken Kurayami and the  swords millennia ago. After his friend Bahato went mad, Yuri was forced to seal him in the Book of Ruin before merging himself with the Kougouken Saikou and sealing himself in turn with the King of Arthur Wonder Ride Book in Avalon. After Touma reaches Avalon and claims King of Arthur in the present, Yuri is freed, gains the ability to project an illusion of his human form, and bears witness to Touma's struggles following Kento's apparent death at Daichi's hands from afar. After Touma defeats Daichi, Yuri approaches the former to warn him of a traitor within the Sword of Logos' Southern Base before helping the novelist clear his name, convincing the Northern Base's swordsmen of the truth, and joining them in stopping the present-day Master Logos, Isaac, and later the Megid Storious. Following Storious' defeat, Yuri is elected to become part of the Sword of Logos' new ruling council.

While transformed, he is capable of fighting through telekinetic movements on his own, though he can also be wielded by either a living silhouette called  or another swordsman. Additionally, the Kougouken Saikou is connected to the Ankokuken Kurayami, which allows Saikou to summon the latter and combine both swords' power to create a black hole-like portal and teleport his opponent to another location. 
 	
After creating the  Wonder Ride Book, Saikou can transform into Saikou Shadow's armor and use three different modes:
X-Swordman: Saikou's default mode that allows him to take over Saikou Shadow's body and utilize his full physical combat prowess.
: Saikou's second mode that transforms him into Saikou Shadow's left arm and enhances its punching capability.
: Saikou's third mode that transforms him into Saikou Shadow's right leg and enhances its kicking capability.

Guest characters
: Rintaro's teacher and predecessor as the Water Swordsman before he was killed by Zooous 15 years prior.
Unnamed priestess: A woman who Isaac based Sophia on and served as a bridge between the then-newly created Wonder World and Earth in the distant past via the Almighty Books power. After choosing Tassel to become Wonder World's first guardian and Storious betrayed her, she sacrificed herself while turning the Almighty Books pages into the Wonder Ride Books, scattering them across Earth, and bestowing the remaining fragments to Tassel and the original Master Logos. The unnamed priestess is portrayed by Rina Chinen.
: Isaac's noble and kind ancestor who founded the Sword of Logos. He originally sought the Almighty Books power to help humanity, but became one of its protectors following Storious' betrayal. The original Master Logos is portrayed by Keisuke Sohma.
Another Sophia: A clone of Sophia that Storious creates to serve as a sacrifice in his ritual to restore the Tome of Omniscience. Another Sophia is portrayed by Rina Chinen.
: Ryo's childhood friend turned wife, Sora's mother, and an employee at a foreign-affiliated company who first appears in the tie-in prequel manga Supplementary Volume Kamen Rider Saber: Kamen Rider Buster the Comic. While attending Kagari High School together, Haruka became student council president and captain of the women's volleyball team in her senior year. Six years after Haruka graduated from university and married Ryo, she gave birth to Sora.
The : Storious' undead minions who were previously the Sword of Logos' Four Sages, members of the order's leadership who developed their swordsmen's fighting styles. After the present day Master Logos, Isaac, secretly murders them, they are resurrected by Storious to serve as his enforcers before they are destroyed by the Sword of Logos' swordsmen.
He is destroyed by Kamen Rider Kenzan via Desast and Kamen Rider Falchion's powers.
He is destroyed by Kamen Rider Slash.
: The wielder of the  dual rapiers. He is destroyed by Kamen Rider Sabela.
He is destroyed by Kamen Riders Kenzan and Espada.
: A weaver-girl-themed monster from a parallel world and the counterpart of Hikoboshi World. After mysteriously ending up in the Sword of Logos' world, he is destroyed by Twokaizer and Kamen Rider Saber. Orihime World is voiced by Sōichirō Hoshi.
: A  from the parallel world of  who travels the multiverse in the hybrid battleship/crocodile-themed  mecha with his family and can transform into . He pursues Orihime World to the Sword of Logos' world and gains their help in destroying the monster before returning to the Zenkaigers' world.
It acts on Junpei's resentment towards his successful friends for abandoning him until it is destroyed by Kamen Riders Saber and Espada while a reformed Junpei willingly gives the Batta Vistamp to Fenix and accepts his friends' decisions to move on.
 and : A young boy and his inner demon who are capable of transforming into  and Vice respectively. They and their ally George Karizaki pursue the Batta Deadman and retrieve its Vistamp after Kamen Riders Saber and Espada destroy it.
: An eccentric Fenix scientist and ally of Igarashi and Vice's who joins them in pursuing the Batta Deadman.

Spin-off exclusive characters

Toshikazu Kamikawa
 was the previous Earth Swordsman and Ryo's predecessor and Japanese classics teacher at Kagari High School who worked as a swordsman on the side. Having lost his wife and realizing that he will lose his ability to wield the Dogouken Gekido due to his old age, he chose Ryo to become his successor. 20 years prior to the series, when Ryo joined the Sword of Logos as the new Earth Swordsman, Kamikawa left to live in quiet retirement before passing away some time prior to the series. He appears exclusively in the tie-in prequel manga Supplementary Volume Kamen Rider Saber: Kamen Rider Buster the Comic.

Kyoichiro Shinsen
 was a genius accountant, the previous Thunder Swordsman, and Kento's predecessor who was killed by Desast 15 years prior to the series. He appears exclusively in the tie-in prequel manga Supplementary Volume Kamen Rider Saber: Kamen Rider Buster the Comic and the live-action prequel special Sword of Logos Saga.

Kyoichiro Shinsen is portrayed by

Amane Kagami
 was a popular elite member of the Sword of Logos' Southern Base, the previous Wind Swordswoman, and Ren's predecessor who was killed by Desast 15 years prior to the series. She appears exclusively in the tie-in prequel manga Supplementary Volume Kamen Rider Saber: Kamen Rider Buster the Comic and the live-action prequel special Sword of Logos Saga.

Asmodeus
 is a former guard for the Sword of Logos'  space station who was petrified and held in his former workplace for going rogue sometime prior to the events of the crossover film Saber + Zenkaiger: Super Hero Senki. After escaping in the present, he seeks to use Shotaro Ishinomori and 80 forbidden books to erase the Kamen Rider and Super Sentai franchises' existence. Asmodeus enlarges, but he is destroyed by the Kamen Riders and the Super Sentai's mecha.

In his monstrous form, Asmodeus wields a pair of swords and can absorb the mecha of evil organizations from both franchises to turn into his gigantic dragon form.

Shotaro Ishinomori
, born  was a manga artist, the creator of the Kamen Rider and Super Sentai franchises, and an apprentice of Osamu Tezuka. A younger version of Ishinomori appears exclusively in the crossover film Saber + Zenkaiger: Super Hero Senki.

Shotaro Ishinomori's younger self is portrayed by

Kamen Rider Tassel
He resurrects Asmodeus, the Lords of Wise, and Charybdis, who creates a copy of the Almighty Book and clones of the three commander Megids and Desast, to serve as his minions. However, he is destroyed by Kamen Rider Saber. Kamen Rider Tassel appears exclusively in the stage show Kamen Rider Saber: Final Stage.

Kamen Rider Tassel utilizes Kamen Rider Falchion's BlaDriver and Mumeiken Kyomu and the  Wonder Ride Book in place of Eternal Phoenix to transform. 

Kamen Rider Tassel is voiced by Tobi from Les Romanesques, who also portrays Tassel.

Mamiya
 is a doctor and the adult counterpart of Riku who appears exclusively in the V-Cinema Kamen Rider Saber: Trio of Deep Sin. Eight years prior to the events of the V-Cinema, when Riku touched Kamen Rider Falchion's Mumeiken Kyomu, Mamiya was born from him. With the Amazing Siren Wonder Ride Book, he poses as Touma and Kento's childhood friend and seeks to erase the swordsmen's existence by erasing people's memories of them.

Yuina Tachibana
 is Kento's fiancée who lost her former fiancé in a Megid attack and appears exclusively in the V-Cinema Kamen Rider Saber: Trio of Deep Sin. Eight years prior to the events of the V-Cinema, she accepted a copy of the Amazing Siren Wonder Ride Book from Mamiya.

Shinjiro Shinozaki
 is Rintaro's father who appears exclusively in the V-Cinema Kamen Rider Saber: Trio of Deep Sin. Eight years prior to the events of the V-Cinema, he sent Mamiya to create a copy of the Amazing Siren Wonder Ride Book so he can challenge Rintaro.

Riku
 is an orphan boy whom Touma cares for and appears exclusively in the V-Cinema Kamen Rider Saber: Trio of Deep Sin.

Rui Mitarai
 is a member of the Mitarai clan, a famous Sword of Logos family on par with the Shindai clan, who appears exclusively in the web-exclusive special Kamen Rider Saber Spin-off: Kamen Rider Sabela & Durendal. After killing the head of his clan with the power of an Alter Rider Book, he seeks to take over the Sword of Logos for peace in the world before the Shindai siblings stop him.

Notes

References

External links
Cast on TV Asahi

Fictional knights
Saber
, Kamen Rider Saber